Mi Delirio World Tour (better known as "MDWT") is the first worldwide concert tour by Mexican singer Anahí, in support of her fifth studio album, Mi Delirio (2009). The tour was officially announced in August 2009 during her promotional tour in Brazil. According to Billboard, MDWT is the seventh most profitable tour of 2010.

Concert synopsis

Mi Delirio World Tour
The tour had its debut on November 3, 2009, in São Paulo, Brazil, with more than 3,000 people and end on March 25, 2010, at the Teatro Metropolitan in Mexico. 
In addition to São Paulo, the Brazilian cities the tour visited were Rio de Janeiro on November 5 and November 7 Fortaleza. On December 5, the tour visited Argentina for the first time since the separation of RBD and on December 6 visited Chile.

In March 2010, Anahi gave three concerts in Europe, beginning in Serbia on March 10, Slovenia on March 12 and Romania on March 13. That same month, Anahi first sang in Mexico since the separation of RBD. There were three concerts, one in Monterrey on March 20, one in Guadalajara on March 21 and ending the tour in Mexico City on March 25 at the Metropolitan theater, the concerts counted with the presence of various guests, including Amanda Miguel, Mario Sandoval and his niece, Ana Paula. According to Billboard, the tour was the seventh most profitable in 2010 that only 10 concerts attended by over 35,000 people. Only at the concert on September 1, 2010, raised more than $851,000. The opening of the tour was in the hands of the Mexican group Matute.

Mi Delirio World Tour Reloaded
 
In June 2010, was officially announced by Guillermo Rosas, Anahí's manager, and RRPRO (Rafael Reisman Productions) that MDWT was planned to have a second stage called Mi Delirio World Tour Reloaded. It started on October 6, 2010, in Fortaleza, Brazil with an acoustic show. The entire show with its revamped setlist was performed for the first time on October 9, 2010, in Rio de Janeiro.

In December, the tour visited Europe with the first show was in Madrid on December 11, 2010, the writer Paulo Coelho was going to watch this show but for some inconvenience, not arrive in time, also had the participation of singer Jaime Terrón. Other European countries that were visited were Romania, Croatia and Serbia, which had the participation of Guatemalan singer Penya.

The official DVD of the tour was planned to be recorded in this phase. A big part of it was recorded on October 10, 2010, in São Paulo. Anahí confirmed that the DVD will contain footage from the show in São Paulo, Brazil and her shows in various European countries such as Spain, Romania, Croatia and Serbia. Besides the footage from the concerts, the DVD will also include images from backstage and her visits in countries like Brazil, Spain and Romania. In the acoustic show on February 9, 2011, in Mexico, Anahi singing with Noel Schajris the song  "Alérgico" and with Mario Sandoval Aleph, they composed the song together for the book "O Aleph" by Paulo Coelho.

Go Any Go
MDWT had a third phase called Go Any Go. This phase started with two special shows on March 26 and March 27, 2011, in São Paulo and Rio de Janeiro. This shows were made in collaboration with Christian Chávez, who presented his Libertad World Tour mixed with Go Any Go. The tour also occurs in Mexico, offering their last 4 concerts in Mexico city, Querétaro and Monterrey. In Mexico, Anahi with Christian Chavez sings the song "Libertad" As in previous phases, the opening was by "Matute"

Setlist

Tour dates

Additional Notes
 A  During his presentation in Mexico City, Anahi was joined by Amanda Miguel during "Él Me Mintio" and Mario Sandoval during "Hasta Que Me Conociste". 
 B  During his presentation in Madrid, Anahí was joined by Jaime Terrón during "No Te Quiero Olvidar".
 D  During his presentation in São Paulo and Rio de Janeiro, Anahí was joined by Noel Schajris during "Alérgico", "Entra En Mi Vida" and "Te Vi Venir" and Christian Chávez during "Feliz Cumpleaños" and "Libertad".

Cancellations and rescheduled shows

Gallery

References

External links

 AnahíMagia.com – Anahí Official Site

2009 concert tours
2010 concert tours
2011 concert tours
Anahí concert tours
Concert tours of Europe
Concert tours of North America
Concert tours of South America